Friedenau Dam is a gravity concrete dam in Khomas Region, Namibia.

References

Dams in Namibia
Dams completed in 1972
Buildings and structures in Khomas Region
1972 establishments in South West Africa